Sirsa is a city and municipal council in Haryana, India.

Sirsa may also refer to:

Places
 Sirsa district, the district of the Indian city
 Sirsa (tehsil), a tehsil (sub-district) of Sirsa district, centred on the city
 Sirsa (Lok Sabha constituency), a ten Lok Sabha (parliamentary) constituencies centred on the city
 Sirsa, Uttar Pradesh, a town and nagar panchayat in Uttar Pradesh, India

Other uses
 Sirsa (1983), a steamship owned by the British India Steam Navigation Company
 Sirsa Air Force Station, an Indian Air Force station in Sirsa